Eric Dupont may refer to: 

Eric Dupont (producer), French film producer
Éric Dupont (writer), Canadian novelist
Éric Dupond-Moretti, French lawyer